Playback is an online Canadian film, broadcasting, and interactive media trade journal owned by Brunico Communications. It was previously published biweekly as a print magazine for the Canadian entertainment industry. It is widely considered to be a "must read" amongst industry professionals.

History 

The magazine has since begun to report on advancements in the online digital media industry as well, specifically web series and related events, media, and culture. The magazine also reports on funding resources for filmmakers, technical advancements in the industry, and trends. It is widely considered to be a "must read" amongst industry professionals.

In May 2010, Playback magazine stopped publishing its biweekly print edition and became an exclusively online magazine.

References

External links

Biweekly magazines published in Canada
Broadcasting in Canada
Canadian film websites
Defunct magazines published in Canada
Film magazines published in Canada
Magazines established in 1986
Magazines disestablished in 2010
Magazines published in Toronto
Online magazines published in Canada
Online magazines with defunct print editions
Professional and trade magazines
Websites about digital media